The Hidișel is a right tributary of the river Holod in Romania. It flows in southern direction and discharges into the Holod in the village Holod. Another river named Hidișel originates close to the source of this river, but flows northwest towards the Crișul Repede.

References

Rivers of Romania
Rivers of Bihor County